Tempo Networks is a pan-Caribbean television channel that broadcasts Caribbean music and other cultural products. Its programming includes music videos, news, dramas, and documentaries about Caribbean life. Musical genres broadcast include Reggae, Soca, Dancehall, Ska, Calypso, Chutney, Chutney Soca, Reggaeton, and Punta rock. Its programming is mostly in English.

It was launched on November 30, 2005 under the ownership of MTV Networks and corporate parent Viacom. Since 2007, it has been owned by founder Frederick Morton, Jr., and is based in Newark, NJ.

The station broadcasts on Cablevision in the New York Metropolitan Area (Channel 1105), and reaches over 3,500,000 viewers in the Caribbean. It streams live over the internet 24 hours a day.

History
Tempo was launched by MTV Networks in 2005. In conjunction with the launch of Tempo, MTV Networks hosted a concert series entitled "Caribbean Rising." It featured performances across several different musical genres.

Programs
Badness Outta Style
Choices
Cook-Up
Cross Caribbean Countdown
Downtown Island
Inside the Rhythm
My TEMPO Trip
Pull up Selecta
Rise & Shine
TEMPO Live & Direct
TEMPO Presents: Artists, Events, and Music Video Making-ofs
West wood Park

ORIGINAL FILMS
 HUSH
 HUSH 2
 Hooked
 The Black Moses Pindling
 Chrissy
 Between Friends

Events
Major events hosted by Tempo include the "Tempo Turns" events, concerts held throughout the Caribbean islands and United States, which draw tens of thousands of attendees from around the world. "TEMPO Turns 6" was held at Six Flags / Great Adventure in Jackson, New Jersey.

Pro-social initiatives
TEMPO has carried out several socially conscious campaigns, including the Badness Outta Style school tours, One Love/Haiti, and TEMPO Water.

Other
Additional projects include TEMPO Bookings, connecting Caribbean artists with event planners, and the TEMPO Web Store.  It has also worked with tourist boards throughout the region, including those of Antigua, Trinidad & Tobago, Grenada, USVI, Barbados, and Turks & Caicos.

Partners
American Airlines
Bahamas Telecommunications Company
Cable & Wireless
Carib
Digicel
Heineken
Liat
Lime
RIM/Blackberry
Sony/Ericsson
VP Records

See also
CaribVision
Chantal Bolivar
List of Caribbean television stations

References

External links
Tempo

Press
Atlanta Post - How he Built it: Frederick A. Morton, Founder of Caribbean Media Company TEMPO Networks
New York Times - Selling the Caribbean from the Island of Newark
NJ Monthly Magazine - Island in the City
Newark Star Ledger - Newark Entrepreneur Creates TV Station Devoted to Caribbean Content
Montclair Times - Montclair Man Preps to Launch Caribbean Television Station in the U.S.
Trinidad and Tobago Guardian - TEMPO Networks Gears Fifth Anniversary
Cable & Wireless Caribbean - Partnerships : MTV Tempo - Press Release
Is MTV Losing Tempo?

Music video networks in the United States
Caribbean music
Television channels and stations established in 2005
Television stations in the Caribbean
Caribbean cable television networks
Former Viacom subsidiaries
Companies based in Newark, New Jersey
Soca music
Reggae
Dancehall
Calypso music
Reggaeton
Television stations in New Jersey
Bachata
Zouk
Mass media in Newark, New Jersey
2005 establishments in the United States